Coloe Fossae is a set of troughs in the Ismenius Lacus quadrangle of Mars.  It is centered at 36.5 degrees north latitude and 302.9 west longitude.  It is 576 km long and was named after a classical albedo feature.

References

See also
 Fossa (geology)

Ismenius Lacus quadrangle
Valleys and canyons on Mars